Kuusiku is a small borough in Rapla Parish, Rapla County, Estonia. It has a population of 250. Kuusiku Manor and Rapla Airfield (Kuusiku Airfield) are located in Kuusiku.

Climate

Gallery

References

External links
Rapla Parish 
Kuusiku Manor

Boroughs and small boroughs in Estonia